Bograd (Russian & Khakas: Боград, Bograd) is a rural locality (a selo) and the administrative center of Bogradsky District of the Republic of Khakassia, Russia. Population: 

Founded in 18th century, it was renamed in 1933 after revolutionary

References

Notes

Sources

Rural localities in Khakassia